Libellula depressa, the broad-bodied chaser or broad-bodied darter, is one of the most common dragonflies in Europe and central Asia. It is very distinctive with a very broad flattened abdomen, four wing patches and, in the male, the abdomen becomes pruinose blue.

Identification 
The male and female have a broad, flattened abdomen which is brown with yellow patches down the sides. In the male the abdomen develops a blue pruinosity that covers the brown colour. Both fore and hind wings have a dark patch at the base. Both the male and female have broad antehumeral stripes. The average wingspan is approximately 70 mm. L. depressa is very distinctive and should not be confused with any other dragonflies in the region.

Distribution and habitat
L. depressa is found in central and southern Europe, central Asia and the Middle East. It range extends northwards to southern Scotland, southern Sweden and southern Finland and it occurs on some Mediterranean islands including Corsica, Sardinia, Sicily, and Menorca. Its range does not extend beyond southern Europe into Africa.

L. depressa is seen near still-water lakes and ponds, feeding on many types of small insects.  They occur in both bare and sunny locations, where it is often the first dragonfly to colonise new habitats such as newly created ponds, and well vegetated ponds. L. depressa are often seen away from water as the adults are very mobile and undergo a period of maturation away from water after emergence. The adults are also migratory.

Behaviour

The flight period is from April to September but are mostly seen in May and June. Their flight is very fast as they dart and dive above the water. They are very territorial and will fight with rival males and any other dragonflies they happen to encounter.  They characteristically return to a favoured perch, in the sun. When a female enters a male's territory the male will fly up and grab the female. Mating occurs on the wing and the pair are in tandem for only a brief period, often less than a minute. The pair separate and the female will find a suitable location for ovipositing, usually a stretch of open water with submerged vegetation. The female oviposits in flight, hovering above the water and dipping the tip of her abdomen in.
The eggs hatch in 4 or 5 weeks and the larvae take one to two years to develop. The larvae live in the silt and detritus at the bottom of the pond, lying buried in mud with just the head and eyes showing. After emergence the adults move away from water and undergo a period of maturation which lasts 10 to 14 days.

Systematics
This species is usually placed in the genus Libellula but there is some evidence, based on RNA and DNA analysis, that this species should be placed within the genus Ladona (Artiss et al., 2001). This change is not yet generally accepted and books and field guides list this species as Libellula

See also
 Libellula
 Libellulidae
 List of British dragonflies

References

 
 
 Askew, R. R. (2004) The Dragonflies of Europe. (revised ed.) Harley Books. 
 Boudot J. P., et al. (2009) Atlas of the Odonata of the Mediterranean and North Africa. Libellula Supplement 9 :1–256.
 d'Aguilar, J., Dommanget, J. L., and Prechac, R. (1986) A field guide to the Dragonflies of Britain, Europe and North Africa. Collins. pp336. 
 Dijkstra, K.-D. B & Lewington, R. (2006) Field Guide to the Dragonflies of Britain and Europe. British Wildlife Publishing.

External link
 

Libellulidae
Dragonflies of Europe
Odonata of Asia
Taxa named by Carl Linnaeus
Insects described in 1758
Articles containing video clips